In modern Swedish, Folkung has two meanings, which appear to be opposites:

 The medieval "House of Bjelbo" in Sweden, which produced several Swedish statesmen and kings. 
 A group of people (singular Folkunge, plural Folkungar), who were at times in political opposition to the same House of Bjelbo. This "political party" fought for the ancient right of free men to elect the kings in Sweden.

Until the 17th century, Folkunge was used only with the second meaning. However, many of these political opponents were also said to have been descendants of Jarl Folke the Fat (from the House of Bjelbo), who lived before the family became royal. Hence, in the 17th century, the whole family, then already extinct and without any established name, became known as the House of Folkung (Folkungaätten in Swedish).

Later research, though, showed that the political Folkungs were not just descendants of Jarl Folke—instead, they belonged to different Swedish noble families, united by the ambition to fight against a central ruler of Sweden. According to one theory, Folkungs wanted to keep the old "freedom" of the petty kingdoms, including the election of kings, and to retain local power in their own control. Many Folkungs came from the ancient provinces of Svealand, opposing the ruling families of the time that were mostly from Götaland. The first Folkung uprising in 1229 was successful, elevating Canute II onto the throne. Later developments were less promising, and the centralized system eventually suppressed their resistance.

See also
 Unification of Sweden
 Battle of Sparrsätra

References

Bibliography

13th century in Sweden
Norse clans

pl:Folkungowie